Exiliscelis is a genus of gnats, gall midges, and March flies in the family Canthyloscelidae. There is one described species in Exiliscelis, E. californiensis.

References

Psychodomorpha genera
Articles created by Qbugbot